Kyrgyzstan participated in the Turkvision Song Contest 2013 in Eskişehir, Turkey. Çoro were selected as the Kyrgyzstani artist in a national final, with the song "Kaygırba" internally selected at a later date.

Before Turkvision
Kyrgyzstan were revealed as one of the participating countries in the contest on 19 October 2013.

National final
Auditions for the national final were held in Bishkek, and began on 23 October 2013. The auditions were open to artists between the ages of 18 and 30. Over 200 people participated in the auditions.

Semi-final
The semi-final took place on 9 November 2013. 17 artists participated in the semi-final, and the qualifiers were selected by a panel of 5 judges who marked the performances out of 10, with a maximum score of 50. The top 11 artists (highlighted) qualified for the final on 16 November 2013.

Final
The final took place on 16 November 2013. The running order draw was held on 11 November 2013. 11 artists participated in the final. The winner was decided by a combination of jury and public SMS voting. SMS voting opened on 12 November and closed after the final performance on 16 November.

Song selection
While "Tooluk kız", Çoro's entry in the national final, was originally confirmed as the Kyrgyzstani entry for the Turkvision Song Contest 2013, Çoro ultimately performed "Kaygırba" at the contest.

Artist and song information

Çoro
Çoro is a Kyrgyzstani group formed in 2012. The group was named after Kyrgyzstani musician .

Kaygırba
"Kaygırba" is a song performed by Kyrgyzstani group Çoro, which represented Kyrgyzstan in the Turkvision Song Contest 2013.

References

Countries in the Turkvision Song Contest 2013
2013
Turkvision